Blake Julia Dietrick (born July 19, 1993) is an American professional basketball player who is currently playing for Lyon ASVEL in France. After signing a contract in August 2021 and becoming a team member for the Atlanta Dream during the 2021 season. She played previously for the Seattle Storm in the WNBA, and the Gernika KESB in Spain. She played college basketball at Princeton.

High school and college
Born in Wellesley, Massachusetts, Dietrick played basketball for Wellesley High School, where she scored a school record 1,440 career points, leading the team to an 84-9 record during that time. Dietrick was also a three-time All-American in lacrosse, earning first team US Lacrosse honors her sophomore through senior years.

In her final season for Princeton, Dietrick was named Ivy League Player of the Year and chosen as an All-American honorable mention by the Associated Press and Women's Basketball Coaches Association. She also led the Ivy League in assists (4.9/game) while setting her school's single-season assists record (157). Princeton went 30–0 during regular season, won the conference outright, received a bid to the 2015 NCAA Women's Division I Basketball Tournament and advanced to the second round.

Professional career
In 2016, she was chosen as a free agent by the Seattle Storm and played in two games. She later signed a 7-day contract with the San Antonio Stars and played in one game. She then went on to play for a year for the Bendigo Spirit of Australia's WNBL. From 2017 to 2018, she was on the Greek AO Dafni Agioy Dimitriou team.

In 2015, she had training camp stints with the Washington Mystics and Los Angeles Sparks but was later waived.

College statistics

Source:

References

External links
 Princeton Tigers bio

1993 births
Living people
American women's basketball players
Atlanta Dream players
Basketball players from Massachusetts
People from Wellesley, Massachusetts
Point guards
Princeton Tigers women's basketball players
Princeton Tigers women's lacrosse players
San Antonio Stars players
Seattle Storm players
Undrafted Women's National Basketball Association players
Wellesley High School alumni